Eliya VII ( / Elīyā, d. 26 May 1617) was Patriarch of the Church of the East from 1591 to 1617, with residence in Rabban Hormizd Monastery, near Alqosh, in modern Iraq. On several occasions, in 1605-1607 and 1610, and again in 1615–1616, he negotiated on with representatives of the Catholic Church, but without any final conclusion. In older historiography, he was designated as Eliya VII, but later renumbered as Eliya "VIII" by some authors. After the resolution of several chronological questions, he was designated again as Eliya VII, and that numeration is accepted in recent scholarly works.

See also
 Patriarch of the Church of the East
 List of Patriarchs of the Church of the East
 Assyrian Church of the East

Notes

References

External links 

Patriarchs of the Church of the East
16th-century bishops of the Church of the East
1617 deaths
Year of birth missing
17th-century bishops of the Church of the East
Assyrians from the Ottoman Empire
16th-century archbishops
17th-century archbishops
Bishops in the Ottoman Empire
16th-century people from the Ottoman Empire
17th-century people from the Ottoman Empire